Yankee Hill is an unincorporated community in Tuolumne County, in the U.S. state of California.

References

Unincorporated communities in California
Unincorporated communities in Tuolumne County, California